Glory of the Seas is a children's historical novel by Agnes Hewes. It is set in Boston, Massachusetts, during the 1850s. The novel, illustrated by N.C. Wyeth, was first published in 1933 and was a Newbery Honor recipient in 1934.

The novel has two main themes. The first concerns the development of the clipper ship passenger service between the East Coast and California around Cape Horn. The second concerns the Fugitive Slave Law of 1850 and the enforced return of escaped slaves across state boundaries.

References

1933 American novels
Children's historical novels
American children's novels
Newbery Honor-winning works
Novels set in Boston
Novels set in the 1850s
1933 children's books